The 1927 Simmons Cowboys football team represented Simmons University—now known as Hardin–Simmons University—as a member of the Texas Conference during 1927 college football season. Led by Frank Bridges in his first season as head coach, the team went 5–3–2 overall, placing second in the Texas Conference with a mark of 2–1–2.

Schedule

References

Simmons
Hardin–Simmons Cowboys football seasons
Simmons Cowboys football